Arthur Horace Swinson (1915–1970) was a British Army officer, writer, playwright, and historian. A prolific playwright, he authored more 300 works.

Swinson was born in St Albans, Hertfordshire, to Hugh Swinson and Lilla Fisher Swinson. He attended St Albans School. He enlisted in the Rifle Brigade in 1939 and in 1940 was commissioned into the Worcestershire Regiment. In the Far East, he fought at the 1944 Battle of Kohima as a staff captain with the British 5th Brigade, which commanded the 7th Battalion of his regiment. The diaries he kept during the battle are now lodged in the Imperial War Museum. He served until 1946, with postings in Malaya, Burma, Assam and India during World War II.  In 1949, he subsequently became a writer and producer at the BBC where he produced a number of programmes for Richard Attenborough.

In 1966, Swinson wrote and published "Kohima," an account of the Battle of Kohima which was fought from April to June 1944 and in which he was a participant. The preface states that Field Marshal William Slim directed Swinson to ensure that Kohima and Imphal are described as twin battles fought under Slim's 14th Army. This Swinson does. Ultimately, however, the book focuses on the experience of the British 2nd Infantry Division. The book is a good adjunct to Slim's "Defeat into Victory" and Masters' "Road Past Mandalay."

Swinson was the author of Scotch on the Rocks (1963 and 2005), which told the true story of the wartime wreck of the SS Politician, on which Compton Mackenzie's novel Whisky Galore (1947) – and the Ealing Comedy of the same title – were based.

He died in Spain while on vacation, aged 55. He was survived by his wife, Joyce Budgen, and their three children.

References

Bibliography
 Writing for Television Today. A & C Black 1965
 Sergeant Corks Casebook. Arrow 1965
 Casebook of Medical Detection;;. Peter Davies 1965
 North-West Frontier,. Frederick A. Praeger, New York, Washington, 1967
 Siege of Saragoda,, Corgi Books
 The Great Air Race, Cassell 1968
 Four Samurai : A Quartet of Japanese Army Commanders in the Second World War. Hutchinson 1968
 Commanders in the Second World War. Hutchinson 1968
 The Memoirs of Private Waterfield. Cassell 1968 ( with Donald Scott)
 Defeat in Malaya – the fall of Singapore, Ballantine Books, New York, 1970
 Six Minutes to Sunset. Peter Davies 1964
 Scotch on the Rocks.  Reprinted Luath Press 2005
 The Temple. Michael Joseph 1970
 Defeat in Malaya: The Fall of Singapore. Ballantine 1970
 Frederick Sander: The Orchid King. Hodder & Stoughton 1970
 Beyond the Frontiers: The Biography of Colonel F. M. Bailey, Explorer and Special Agent. Hutchinson 1971
 A Register of the Regiments and Corps of the British Army. Archive Press 1972
 Wingate in Peace and War an account of the Chindit Commander. MacDonald 1972
 Mountbatten. Pan/Ballantine 1973
 Guadalcanal: Island Ordeal. Ballantine 1973
 The Raiders: Desert Strike Force''. Ballantine 1972

1915 births
1970 deaths
English historians
British Army personnel of World War II
Worcestershire Regiment officers
English dramatists and playwrights
People from St Albans
Rifle Brigade soldiers
English male dramatists and playwrights
20th-century English male writers
Military personnel from Hertfordshire